The 2016 LNB Pro A Leaders Cup season was the 20th edition of this tournament, the fourth since it was renamed as Leaders Cup. The event included the eight top teams from the first half of the 2015–16 LNB Pro A regular season and was played in Disneyland Paris. AS Monaco Basket, a newcomer in the Pro A, took the title and Jamal Shuler was named the tournament's MVP.

Bracket

Final

References

Leaders Cup
Leaders Cup